Takab Rural District is a rural district (dehestan) in the Central District of Dargaz County, Razavi Khorasan Province, Iran. At the 2006 census, its population was 5,892, in 1,627 families.  The rural district has 30 villages.

References 

Rural Districts of Razavi Khorasan Province
Dargaz County